Motilal Oswal is an Indian businessman. He is the founder, chairman and managing director of Motilal Oswal Financial Services Ltd (MOFSL) which he co-founded with Raamdeo Agrawal in 1987.

Early life 
Oswal was born to a Jain family in a small village of Padru in Barmer, Rajasthan near the international border. His father was a grain trader and a well to do businessman. However instead of joining the family trade, Oswal decided to pursue formal education. He studied at the SPU Jain College in Falna before moving to Mumbai to study CA. In 1987 during his stay at a Mumbai hostel, the Rajasthan Vidyarthi grih Oswal met Raamdeo Agarwal, his friend with whom he later founded his company MOFSL.

Career 
After working with a private audit firm for a while Oswal and Agarwal started their own accounting firm. They later decided to join the BSE as sub brokers. During those times the exchange was dominated by Gujarati traders, however the duo met a broker on the floor who got them a sub broker position at the BSE. They were issued a badge with the name Motilal Oswal which subsequently became the name of their company they founded in 1989. Over time both friends demarcated their responsibilities in their company. While Agarwal looked into finance with his 40-member research team, Oswal took charge of customer support, HR, operations and expansion with franchisee network.

Awards
For his work and contribution to the capital markets,  Oswal has received several awards including:

 Mr. Motilal Oswal, Chairman & MD is awarded as Outstanding Institution Builder of the year in The AIMA Managing India Awards
 Special Contribution award to Indian Capital Markets’ Award by Zee Business 
 The Hall of Fame for Excellence in Franchising’ by Franchising World Magazine 
Champion of Arthshastra’ by the Rotary Club

Recognition
Oswal has received the Rashtriya Samman Patra awarded by the Government of India for being amongst the highest income taxpayers in the country for a period of 5 years from FY95–FY99.

Oswal is associated with various social organisations. He is the President of the Jain International Trade Organisation (JITO) and a Trustee of "Agarwal-Oswal Chhatravas" of the Rajasthan Vidyarthi Griha; among others.

He has authored two books of quotations on The Essence of Business & Management and The Essence of Life.

References

Businesspeople from Mumbai
Businesspeople from Rajasthan
Rajasthani people
Living people
Indian accountants
Year of birth missing (living people)
Indian investors
Indian Jains